Alcest / Les Discrets (or Les Discrets / Alcest) is a split EP by French shoegazing bands Alcest and Les Discrets, released on November 30, 2009 by Prophecy Productions.

This is the release debut of Les Discrets; its leader Fursy Teyssier have previously worked with Alcest leader Neige numerous times, either as musician or cover artist. It is the first Alcest work of to feature drummer Winterhalter, although he only performed on Les Discrets' songs; he would join Alcest later the same year.

Track listing

Personnel 
 Alcest
 Neige – lead vocals, guitar, bass, synthesizer, drums

 Les Discrets
 Fursy Teyssier – lead vocals, guitar, bass
 Audrey Hadorn – vocals
 Winterhalter – drums

 Production
 Fursy Teyssier – cover art

References 

Alcest albums
Les Discrets albums
2009 EPs
Split EPs
Shoegaze EPs